U L Washington (born October 27, 1953) is an American former professional baseball player and coach. He played in Major League Baseball (MLB) from 1977 to 1987 for the Kansas City Royals, Montreal Expos, and Pittsburgh Pirates. Washington played mostly as a shortstop during his career, and was well known for having a toothpick in the corner of his mouth while on the field and at the plate. The U and L are not initials, but rather are his given legal name.

Early life
Washington was born in Stringtown, Oklahoma, where he attended Stringtown High School and then the nearby Murray State College.

Playing career
Washington is one of only three MLB players, along with Ron Washington (no relation) and Frank White, who were products of the Royals Academy.

Kansas City Royals
Washington played for the Royals from 1977 through 1984. His best offensive season was 1982, when he batted .286 with 10 home runs and 60 RBIs – all career highs. Washington was on first base and scored on George Brett's "pine tar" home run in 1983. In his eight seasons with the Royals, Washington hit .254 with 26 home runs and 228 RBIs. He was in four postseason series with the Royals — the 1980 ALCS, 1980 World Series, 1981 ALDS, and 1984 ALCS — batting 12-for-43 (.279) overall.

Montreal Expos
Washington was traded to the Expos in January 1985. He played in 68 games for the Expos as a utility infielder, batting .249 with one home run and 17 RBIs. In November 1985, he became a free agent.

Pittsburgh Pirates
Washington signed with Pittsburgh in January 1986. During his two seasons with the Pirates, he appeared in a total of 82 games, batting .207 with no home runs and ten RBIs, again in a utility infielder role. He was released by the Pirates in October 1987. "I won't go back to the minors, but I haven't said I've officially retired. If someone called and said they wanted me to play in the majors I'd go. I spent nine straight years in the majors, so going back to the minors was the toughest thing for me the past two years. At my age it got to where every time out, I was fighting pain off here or there anyway. I really admire the guys who play until they're 40," Washington said early in the 1988 season.

Senior League
Washington played for the Orlando Juice of the Senior Professional Baseball Association in 1989, the team's only season.

Post-playing career
After his playing career, Washington coached and managed in the minor league organizations of the Pirates (1989), Royals (1991–98), Los Angeles Dodgers (1999), Minnesota Twins (2001–02), and Boston Red Sox (2003–14). In 1992, while coaching the Memphis Chicks, Washington appeared in one game as a shortstop, going hitless in two at bats. Washington went 1 for 1, hitting a line drive off Eric Johnson in the 1991 Cal State Northridge Alumni game.

In 1989, while managing the Welland Pirates in the New York-Penn League, Washington was suspended after knocking the home plate umpire to the ground during an argument.

References

Further reading

External links
, or Retrosheet
U L Washington baseball cards

1953 births
Living people
African-American baseball coaches
African-American baseball managers
African-American baseball players
American expatriate baseball players in Canada
Baseball coaches from Oklahoma
Baseball players from Oklahoma
Hawaii Islanders players
Jacksonville Suns players
Kansas City Royals players
Kingsport Royals players
Major League Baseball shortstops
Memphis Chicks players
Minor league baseball managers
Montreal Expos players
Omaha Royals players
Orlando Juice players
People from Atoka County, Oklahoma
Pittsburgh Pirates players
San Bernardino Pride players
San Jose Bees players
Tiburones de La Guaira players
American expatriate baseball players in Venezuela
Vancouver Canadians players
21st-century African-American people
20th-century African-American sportspeople